A Baháʼí House of Worship or Baháʼí temple is a place of worship of the Baháʼí Faith. It is also referred to by the name Mashriqu'l-Adhkár, which is Arabic for "Dawning-place of the remembrance of God". Baháʼí Houses of Worship are open to both Baháʼís and non-Baháʼís for prayer and reflection. All Baháʼí Houses of Worship have a round, nine-sided shape and are surrounded by nine pathways leading outwards and nine gardens. Baháʼí literature envisages Houses of Worship surrounded by a number of dependencies dedicated to social, humanitarian, educational, and scientific pursuits, although no Baháʼí House of Worship has yet been built up to that extent. At present, most Baháʼí devotional meetings occur in individuals' homes or local Baháʼí centres rather than in Baháʼí Houses of Worship.

, thirteen Baháʼí Houses of Worship have been completed around the world (including one that was later destroyed). Eight of the twelve that are currently standing are continental temples, located in the United States, Uganda, Australia, Germany, Panama, Samoa, India, and Chile. Two of the continental temples, the Lotus Temple and the Santiago Baháʼí Temple, have won numerous architectural awards. The other four standing Baháʼí Houses of Worship are local Houses of Worship. The construction of two national Houses of Worship is underway and the groundbreaking for a fifth local House of Worship has taken place. Furthermore, Baháʼí communities own over 120 properties intended for future Houses of Worship.

History

The Baháʼí House of Worship was first mentioned under the name Mashriqu'l-Adhkár (Arabic for "Dawning-place of the remembrance of God") in the Kitáb-i-Aqdas, the book of laws of Baháʼu'lláh, founder of the Baháʼí Faith. Baháʼu'lláh wrote:
O people of the world! Build ye houses of worship throughout the lands in the name of Him Who is the Lord of all religions. Make them as perfect as is possible in the world of being, and adorn them with that which befitteth them, not with images and effigies. Then, with radiance and joy, celebrate therein the praise of your Lord, the Most Compassionate.

The first Baháʼí House of Worship, in what is now Turkmenistan, was planned during the lifetime of Baháʼu'lláh and then designed and constructed during the ministry of his son and successor, ʻAbdu'l-Bahá. It was completed in 1919 but later expropriated from the Baháʼís and eventually demolished. The cornerstone of the first Baháʼí House of Worship that is still standing, in the United States, was laid in 1912 by ʻAbdu'l-Bahá, and the House of Worship was dedicated in 1953 during the ministry of his grandson and successor, Shoghi Effendi.

Also in 1953, Shoghi Effendi announced a long-term plan to build a temple for each (roughly) continental region. These temples are referred to as "Mother temples" or continental temples and are intended as the first of many temples in their regions. Shoghi Effendi passed away in 1957, but his plans for the construction of Baháʼí Houses of Worship were continued by the Universal House of Justice, a body first elected in 1963 that has led the world Baháʼí community since that time. The Universal House of Justice has included constructing Houses of Worship in the goals of some of its teaching plans. By the end of the twentieth century, further continental Houses of Worship were completed in Uganda, Australia, Germany, Panama, Samoa, and India. In 2001, the Universal House of Justice wrote in its Ridván Message to the Baháʼís of the world that "with profound thankfulness and joy... we announce at this auspicious moment the decision to proceed" with the construction in Chile of the eighth and final continental House of Worship. It was completed in 2016.

Meanwhile, in the Ridván message of 2012, the Universal House of Justice announced the locations of the first local and national Baháʼí Houses of Worship that would be built. The first two national Houses of Worship would be in the Democratic Republic of Congo and Papua New Guinea, while the first five local Houses of Worship would be in Cambodia, India, Kenya, Colombia and Vanuatu. Since then, four of the planned local Houses of Worship have been completed, and the two national Houses of Worship and fifth local House of Worship are in progress. In addition, more than 120 national Baháʼí communities have now acquired properties for the eventual construction of Baháʼí Houses of Worship, compared to 84 national communities that had done so by 1988.

Architecture

All Baháʼí temples share certain architectural elements, some of which are specified by Baháʼí scripture. All Baháʼí Houses of Worship are required to have a round, nine-sided shape and to have nine pathways lead outward and nine gardens surrounding them. While as of 2010 all standing Baháʼí Houses of Worship have a dome, the Baháʼí laws do not require that Houses of Worship have domes. The Greatest Name, a Baháʼí symbol, appears in calligraphy in each temple, often at the top of the dome. All Baháʼí Houses of Worship also have a prayer hall, with seats facing towards the Shrine of Baháʼu'lláh in Acre, Israel, which is the Qiblih, the direction Baháʼís face in their obligatory prayers. Baháʼí scripture also states that no pictures, statues or images may be displayed within the House of Worship and no pulpits or altars incorporated as an architectural feature (though readers may stand behind a simple portable lectern). Each of the Houses of Worship is unique, and to varying degrees the designs reflect the indigenous cultural, social and environmental elements of their location through the selection of materials, landscaping and architecture.

Purpose and activities
A Baháʼí House of Worship is a place of worship of the Baháʼí Faith, where both Baháʼís and non-Baháʼís can express devotion to God. Baháʼí Houses of Worship are open to all regardless of religion, gender, or any other distinction. The only requirements for entry are modest dress and quiet behavior. The Baháʼí laws require that only scriptural texts—of the Baháʼí Faith or other religions—may be read or chanted inside, though in any language. While readings and prayers that have been set to music may be sung by choirs, no musical instruments may be played inside. Several Baháʼí Houses of Worship have established choirs that sing music based on the Baháʼí writings (scriptures). No sermons may be delivered, and no ritualistic ceremonies may be practiced. Memorial services are sometimes held in Bahá'í Houses of Worship, and while wedding ceremonies are not permitted inside, they are often held in the gardens of the temples. In mainly Christian countries, Baháʼí Houses of Worship offer weekly devotional services on Sundays, with the Baháʼí calendar not yet implemented for temple worship.

Baháʼí literature states that a House of Worship should be built in each city and town. According to Shoghi Effendi, a Baháʼí temple is a "silent teacher" of the Baháʼí Faith. Baháʼí literature further stipulates that Houses of Worship should each be surrounded by a complex of humanitarian, educational, and charitable institutions such as schools, hospitals, homes for the elderly, universities, hostels, and other social and humanitarian institutions to serve the areas in which they stand. Shoghi Effendi said the future interaction between the House of Worship and its dependencies could provide "the essentials of Baháʼí worship and service, both so vital to the regeneration of the world." To date, only a few such dependencies have been built and no Baháʼí House of Worship has had the full range of dependencies that are envisioned. Shoghi Effendi also viewed the functions of the House of Worship as complementary to those of the Haziratu'l-Quds (commonly known as a Baháʼí centre), and said that it would be desirable if both these buildings were on the same site. Baháʼí devotional meetings in most communities take place in homes or Baháʼí centres, but Elham Afnan notes that such activities "evoke the spirit" of a House of Worship with the goal that it can eventually be constructed.

Funding and administration
Baháʼí Houses of Worship are funded by the voluntary contributions of Baháʼí communities. There are no collections during temple services and only Baháʼís are permitted to contribute to the Baháʼí funds, including funds for the construction and maintenance of Houses of Worship. ʻAbdu'l-Bahá and Shoghi Effendi both viewed the construction of Baháʼí Houses of Worship in individual countries as projects of the international Baháʼí community. When Houses of Worship are built, the required funds accordingly come from Baháʼís around the world. Worldwide, expenses associated with Houses of Worship (and with the buildings at the Baháʼí World Centre) constitute a significant part of the spending of the Baháʼí administration.

In general, a Baháʼí House of Worship and the grounds on which it is situated are the property of the Baháʼí National Spiritual Assembly of that country, and the properties are held in a financial endowment. A committee of the National Spiritual Assembly of the relevant country administers the House of Worship's activities and affairs, but spiritually they see themselves as custodians of a temple that belongs to all the world's Baháʼís.

Continental Houses of Worship

Wilmette, U.S.

The Wilmette Baháʼí House of Worship is the oldest extant Baháʼí temple and stands on the shore of Lake Michigan near Chicago. It has received architectural awards. In 1978, it was added to the United States National Register of Historic Places. In 2007, the Baháʼí House of Worship was named one of the Seven Wonders of Illinois by the Illinois Bureau of Tourism. The temple is visited by about 250,000 people every year.

During his journeys to the West, ʻAbdu'l-Bahá came to Wilmette for the groundbreaking ceremony of the temple and laid the foundation stone on 1 May 1912. The principal architect was Louis Bourgeois, though his original design ended up being amended numerous times due to impractical elements. Construction began in 1921 and was completed in 1951, and the temple was dedicated in 1953. The total cost of the construction was above $2.6 million. From 1958–2001, the Wilmette House of Worship was associated with a "home for the aged", operated by the U.S. Baháʼí community.

The cladding of the building is composed of a concrete mixture of Portland cement, quartz, and sand, developed for the temple by John Joseph Earley. From ground level, the building stands approximately 58.2 metres tall and the diameter of the dome is 27.4 metres. The auditorium seats 1,191 visitors. The exterior is adorned with symbols from various religions, including the Latin Cross, the Greek Cross, the star and crescent, the Star of David, the swastika (which is an ancient symbol used in Hinduism, Buddhism, and Jainism), and the five-pointed star. The grounds of the temple feature nine fountains, rows of Chinese junipers, and a wide range of flowers including thousands of tulips planted each fall.

Kampala, Uganda

The Kampala Baháʼí House of Worship, sometimes called the Mother Temple of Africa, is situated in the north of Kampala, Uganda's capital and largest city, on Kikaaya Hill in Kawempe Division. Shoghi Effendi announced that the Kampala temple would be built in 1955 after persecution of Baháʼís in Iran made it impossible for them to build one. It was designed by architect Charles Mason Remey. The foundation stone was laid on 26 January 1957 by Rúhíyyih Khánum, representing Shoghi Effendi. Musa Banani, the first Hand of the Cause in Africa, was also present for the groundbreaking and placed a gift of soil from the Shrine of Baháʼu'lláh, sent by Shoghi Effendi, in the foundation. The dedication ceremony was held in January 1961 and was also attended by Rúhíyyih Khánum.

The building is more than 39 metres high, and over 100 metres in diameter at the base. The dome is over 37 metres high and 13 metres in diameter. As a protection against earthquakes that can occur in the region, the temple has a foundation that goes 3 metres beneath the ground. The temple has seating for 800 people. At the time it was built, the Kampala Baháʼí temple was the tallest building in East Africa.

The temple's dome is built out of fixed mosaic tiles from Italy, whereas the tiles of the lower roof are from Belgium. The wall panels contain windows of green, pale blue, and amber colored glass of German origin. Both the timber used for making the doors and benches and the stone used for the walls of the temple are from within Uganda itself. The property includes the House of Worship, extensive gardens, a guest house, and an administrative centre.

Sydney, Australia

The fourth Baháʼí temple to be completed (and third still standing) is in Ingleside in the northern suburbs of Sydney, Australia. This temple serves as the "Mother Temple of the Antipodes". According to Jennifer Taylor, a historian at Sydney University, it is among Sydney's four most significant religious buildings constructed in the twentieth century. The initial design by Charles Mason Remey was given to Sydney architect John Brogan to develop and complete. It was dedicated in September 1961 and opened to the public after four years of construction.

Construction materials include crushed quartz concrete, local hardwoods in the interior, and concrete and marble in the dome. There is seating for 600 people. The building stands 38 metres in height, has a diameter at its widest point of 20 metres, and is a highly visible landmark from Sydney's northern beaches. The property is set high in a natural bushland setting overlooking the Pacific Ocean. The surrounding gardens contain a variety of native Australian flora including waratahs, three species of eucalypts, caleyi and other grevillea, acacia, and woody pear.

Langenhain, Germany

The Mother Temple of Europe is located at the foot of the Taunus Mountains of Germany, in the village of Langenhain near Frankfurt. It was designed by German architect Teuto Rocholl. The foundation stone for the temple was laid on 20 November 1960 by Amelia Collins and the temple was dedicated on 4 July 1964. Its construction was opposed by a number of Catholic and Protestant churches in Germany at the time. The temple's superstructure was prefabricated in the Netherlands out of steel and concrete. The center of the interior of the temple is illuminated by light shining through over 500 glass panels above. At its base, the interior is 48 metres in diameter. The height from ground level is 28.3 metres and the temple can seat up to 600 people. Seena Fazel describes the House of Worship as having a "distinctive concrete and glass modernist design."

Panama City, Panama

The Baháʼí temple in Panama City, Panama was designed by English architect Peter Tillotson. Rúhíyyih Khánum laid the foundation stone on 8 October 1967 and temple was dedicated on 29 April 1972. It is perched on a mountain named Cerro Sonsonate, 10 km northeast of Panama City such that it can be seen from many parts of the city. The temple is built from local stone, which is laid in designs evoking Native American fabric designs and temples of the ancient Americas. The dome is covered with thousands of small oval tiles and rises to a height of 28 metres. The temple has seats made from mahogany for up to 550 people and a floor made from terrazzo.

Tiapapata, Samoa

A Baháʼí House of Worship is situated in Tiapapata, in the hills behind Apia, Samoa. It was designed by Hossein Amanat. Both Malietoa Tanumafili II of Samoa, the world's first Baháʼí head of state, and Rúhíyyih Khánum helped lay the foundation stone on 27 January 1979 and attended the dedication on 1 September 1984. The temple was completed at a total cost of $6.5 million. It has a 30-metre-tall domed structure and seats up to 500 people in the main hall plus 200 on the mezzanine level. The structure is open to the island breezes; Graham Hassall writes that this fosters a suitable environment for meditation and prayer.

New Delhi, India

The Baháʼí House of Worship in Bahapur, New Delhi, India was designed by Iranian-American architect Fariborz Sahba and is commonly known as the Lotus Temple. Rúhíyyih Khánum laid the foundation stone on 17 October 1977 and dedicated the temple on 24 December 1986. The total cost was $10 million. The temple has won numerous architectural awards, including from the Institution of Structural Engineers, the Illuminating Engineering Society of North America, and the Architectural Society of China. It has also become a major attraction for people of various religions, with up to 100,000 visitors on some Hindu holy days; estimates for the number of visitors per year range from 2.5 million to 5 million. The temple is often listed as one of Delhi's main tourist attractions, and even as one of the most visited buildings in the world.

Inspired by the sacred lotus flower, the temple's design is composed of 27 free-standing, marble-clad "petals" grouped into clusters of three and thus forming nine sides. The temple's shape has symbolic and inter-religious significance because the lotus is often associated with the Hindu goddess Lakshmi. Nine doors open onto a central hall with permanent seating for 1,200 people, which can be expanded for a total seating capacity of 2,500 people. The temple rises to a height of 40.8 metres and is situated on a property that covers 105,000 square metres and features nine surrounding ponds. An educational centre beside the temple was established in 2017.

Santiago, Chile

The continental Baháʼí House of Worship for South America (or "Mother Temple for South America") is located in Santiago, Chile. Shoghi Effendi announced Chile as the site for the continental temple of South America in 1953, and in 2001 the process to build the temple was launched. The chosen design was by Siamak Hariri of Hariri Pontarini Architects in Toronto, Ontario, Canada. Excavation was initiated at the site in 2010 and construction began in 2012. The doors opened on 19 October 2016. The Santiago temple cost a total of $30 million to build and has won a range of Canadian and international architectural awards.

The Santiago Baháʼí House of Worship is ringed by nine entrances, nine pathways, and nine fountains, and the structure is composed of nine arching "sails." These have also been described as nine "petals" and the temple's shape as "floral"; the "petals" are separated by glass which allows light to illuminate the temple's interior. The exterior of the "petals" is made from cast glass while the interior is made from translucent Portuguese marble. The sides of the temple are held up on the inside by a steel and aluminum superstructure. The temple can seat 600 people and it is 30 metres high and 30 metres in diameter.

Other Houses of Worship

Completed but destroyed

The first Baháʼí House of Worship was built in the city of Ashgabat, which was then a part of Russia's Transcaspian Oblast and is now the capital of Turkmenistan. It was started in 1902 and mostly completed by 1907, but was not fully finished until 1919. Plans for this House of Worship were first made during the lifetime of Baháʼu'lláh. The design was prepared by Ustad Ali-Akbar Banna, and after his death the construction was supervised by Vakílu'd-Dawlih.

The House of Worship itself was surrounded by gardens with nine ponds. At the four corners of the plot of land surrounding the Ashgabat House of Worship were various buildings: a boys' school; a girls' school; a large meeting hall; and a group of buildings including the offices of the Local Spiritual Assembly, a reading room, and a room for meeting with enquirers.

After serving the community for two decades, the Ashgabat House of Worship was expropriated by the Soviet authorities in 1928 and leased back to the Baháʼís. This lasted until 1938, when it was fully secularized and turned into an art gallery. The 1948 Ashgabat earthquake seriously damaged the building and rendered it unsafe; the heavy rains of the following years weakened the structure, until in 1963 the building was demolished and the site was converted into a public park.

Completed and standing

The Battambang, Cambodia temple was the world's first local Baháʼí House of Worship to be completed. The temple was designed by Cambodian architect Sochet Vitou Tang, who is a practicing Buddhist, and integrates distinctive Cambodian architectural principles. A dedication ceremony and official opening conference took place on 1–2 September 2017, attended by Cambodian dignitaries, locals, and representatives of Baháʼí communities throughout southeast Asia.

The temple in Agua Azul in the municipality of Villa Rica, Cauca Department, Colombia was the second local Baháʼí House of Worship to be completed in the world. The temple design, by architect Julian Gutierrez Chacón, was inspired by the shape of the cocoa seed, which was integral to the local culture before the arrival of the sugar cane industry. An opening dedication ceremony took place on 22 July 2018, followed by devotional services in the House of Worship.

A local Baháʼí House of Worship was opened on 23 May 2021 in Matunda Soy, Kenya.

On 13 November 2021, a local Baháʼí House of Worship opened near the town of Lenakel on the island of Tanna, Vanuatu.

Planned or under construction
Currently, construction of two national Baháʼí Houses of Worship is ongoing in Papua New Guinea and the Democratic Republic of the Congo, while a groundbreaking ceremony has taken place for a local Baháʼí House of Worship in Hargawan near Bihar Sharif, India.

Designs completed

A site was selected and purchased in 1932 for a Baháʼí House of Worship in Hadiqa, northeast of Tehran, Iran. Charles Mason Remey provided a design for this temple which Shoghi Effendi then approved. A drawing of the design was published in an issue of The Baháʼí World. To date, however, the construction of this temple has not been possible.

A design was created for a Baháʼí House of Worship near Mount Carmel in Haifa, Israel. It was created by Charles Mason Remey and approved by Shoghi Effendi in 1952. A photo of the model of the Haifa House of Worship can be found in an issue of The Baháʼí World. An obelisk marks the site where the House of Worship is to be built, but as of 2010, plans for constructing this House of Worship have not been made.

Analysis
Margit Warburg describes the architecture of the Baháʼí Houses of Worship as "remarkable". Denis MacEoin writes that several of the Baháʼí Houses of Worship are "fine examples of modern religious architecture", but argues that no distinct Baháʼí architectural style has emerged given that the best-designed Baháʼí Houses of Worship each have a unique character. Anne Gordon Perry argues, by contrast, that Baháʼí Houses of Worship may provide "the clearest indication of a distinctive Bahá’í aesthetic thus far ... with their characteristic nine sides, circular domes, serene and welcoming gardens and walkways, fountains, and other aesthetic elements".

Warburg writes that the presence of Baháʼí Houses of Worship on all continents except Antarctica shows the worldwide presence of the Baháʼí Faith. She also argues that there are a number of parallels between Baháʼí Houses of Worship and mosques: decoration with geometric patterns rather than images or statues, the absence of offering or communion rituals, and the adaptation of architectural designs to local cultural styles.

Warburg found in her fieldwork at several Baháʼí temples that almost all attendees of weekly services were Baháʼís but that many non-Baháʼís visited at other times during the week. She has questioned whether having the temples open for visitors but without activities at most times during the week is "the optimal mission strategy" for Baháʼís, noting an account of a visitor confused by one temple's apparent lack of purpose. However, Graham Hassall has disputed Warburg's analysis, pointing to the large number of tourists visiting many Baháʼí Houses of Worship and positive coverage in online media such as travel guides and blogs.

Gallery

See also
 List of Baháʼí Houses of Worship
 Terraces (Baháʼí)
 Prayer in the Baháʼí Faith
 Sacral architecture

Notes

Citations

References

Books

Encyclopedias

News media

Other

Further reading

Academic publishers

Baháʼí publisher

External links

The Mashriqu'l-Adhkár - Baháʼí Houses of Worship (from bahai.org, the official site of the world's Baháʼís)
Mashriqul-Adhkar.com (archived compilation of relevant Baháʼí sacred texts)
Chronology and related documents on Baháʼí Library Online

Bahá'í House of Worship
Religious places
Building types